FPR may refer to:

Companies
 Fidelity Printers and Refinery, a Zimbabwean security printer

Law
 Family Procedure Rules, in English and Welsh family courts
 Fichier des personnes recherchées, a French database of wanted people
 Freiwillige Polizei-Reserve, former Berlin police

Politics and military
 Rwandan Patriotic Front
 Popular Front for Recovery, a militia in Chad and the CAR

Sports
 Ford Performance Racing,  Australia

Technology
 Film-type patterned retarder
 Floating-point register
 Filter performance rating
 False positive rate

Other uses
Final proposal revision, a form of response to a request for proposal
 Focal point review, for employee evaluation
 Formyl peptide receptor
 Foundation for Psychocultural Research, Los Angeles, US
 Treasure Coast International Airport, Florida, US, IATA Code